OxMetrics is an econometric software including the  Ox programming language for econometrics and statistics, developed by Jurgen Doornik and David Hendry. OxMetrics originates from PcGive, one of the first econometric software for personal computers, initiated by David Hendry in the 1980s at the London School of Economics.

OxMetrics builds on the Ox programming language of Jurgen Doornik developed at University of Oxford.  describes the history of econometric software packages.

OxMetrics is a family of software packages for the econometric and financial analysis of time series, forecasting, econometric model selection and for the statistical analysis of  cross-sectional data  and panel data.

The main modules apart from PcGive for dynamic econometric models (ARDL, VAR, GARCH, Switching, Autometrics), panel data models (DPD), Limited dependent models,  are STAMP for structural time series modelling, "SsfPack" for State space methods and "G@RCH" for financial volatility modelling.  present many empirical examples in PcGive for OxMetrics in their econometrics textbook.  give modern examples in their time series analysis textbook.

See also 
 Econometric software
 Comparison of statistical packages

References

External links 
 OxMetrics Homepage
PcGive
STAMP software
G@RCH software
 Comparison of mathematical programs for data analysis ScientificWeb

Support 
 Ox mailing list

Econometrics software
Statistical programming languages
Proprietary commercial software for Linux